Sandro Della Piana (born 19 September 1968) is a Swiss former professional tennis player.

Ranked as high as 325 in the world, Della Piana competed mostly on the satellite and Challenger circuits. He was a quarter-finalist at the 1994 Tampere Open and featured in the qualifying draw for the 1994 US Open. His career included an ATP Tour doubles main draw appearance at Schenectady in 1994.

Della Piana is the father of tennis player Henri Laaksonen, who was raised by his mother in her native Finland.

References

External links
 
 

1968 births
Living people
Swiss male tennis players
Swiss people of Italian descent